The Mint Chicks were a New Zealand experimental noise rock/power pop band, active from 2001 to 2010, originally based in Auckland and later in Portland, USA. They were winners of several New Zealand Music Awards. Their output includes three studio albums, four EPs, and 17 singles.

Albums

Studio albums

Extended plays

Singles

References

Rock music group discographies
Discographies of New Zealand artists